Werner Weinhold (born 8 August 1949 in Dresden, East Germany) was a former NVA soldier who shot and killed two East German border guards on 19 December 1975 during a successful attempt to cross the Inner German border from the German Democratic Republic (East Germany) to the Federal Republic of Germany (then called West Germany). The escape took place near the town of Hildburghausen, Thuringia.

Weinhold was tried in the West German courts and was at first acquitted. At a second trial in 1978 he received a sentence of five-and-a-half years for the killings, which was later reduced to three-and-a-half. The incident received much press coverage at the time in both German states.

In 2005 he was arrested by German police for attempted murder. On 8 January 2005 he allegedly shot and seriously injured a 43-year-old acquaintance. Later he was sentenced to two-and-a-half years for actual bodily harm.

Popular culture 
The computer game Wargame: European Escalation creates an alternate history scenario where Werner Weinhold's 1975 defection causes military skirmishes to erupt between East and West Germany that escalates into World War III between NATO and the Warsaw Pact.

Further reading 
 Kurt Frotscher, Horst Liebig: Opfer deutscher Teilung. Beim Grenzschutz getötet. GNN-Verlag, Schkeuditz 2005, .

See also 
 Deportation of North Koreans by the South Korean Government

References

External links 
 http://www.spiegel.de/sptv/reportage/0,1518,208376,00.html
 http://www.mdr.de/doku/428195-hintergrund-1575731.html

1949 births
Living people
Military personnel from Dresden
East German defectors
National People's Army personnel
People convicted of murder by Germany
East German emigrants to West Germany
Criminals from Saxony